Oaklandon Historic District is a national historic district located at Indianapolis, Indiana.  It encompasses 38 contributing buildings in the mid-19th century settlement of Oaklandon.  The district developed between about 1908 and 1941, and includes representative examples of Classical Revival, Late Gothic Revival, and Bungalow / American Craftsman style architecture.  Notable buildings include the Oaklandon Christian Church (1908), Oaklandon Universalist Church (1921), and Dr. Charles J. Kneer Residence (1923).

It was listed on the National Register of Historic Places in 2013.

References

Historic districts on the National Register of Historic Places in Indiana
Neoclassical architecture in Indiana
Gothic Revival architecture in Indiana
Bungalow architecture in Indiana
Historic districts in Indianapolis
National Register of Historic Places in Indianapolis